Kramgoa låtar 12 is a 1984 Vikingarna studio album. The album was rereleased to CD in 1988 and 1992.

Track listing

Side 1
Albatross
Så vi möts igen
Där rosor aldrig dör
Minns du de orden
Danny Boy (instrumental)
Vi måste ses igen
Nu är det bara du och jag

Side 2
Röda rosor, röda läppar
Elvis-Medley
Kärleken är som den är
Skänk en blomma
Raring (Honey)
Borta bra, men hemma bäst

Charts

References 

1984 albums
Vikingarna (band) albums
Swedish-language albums